Paterson Chato Nguendong (born 1 December 1996) is a Congolese professional footballer who plays as a midfielder for VfL Osnabrück.

References

External links

1996 births
Living people
Sportspeople from Goma
Democratic Republic of the Congo footballers
German footballers
Democratic Republic of the Congo emigrants to Germany
Association football midfielders
2. Bundesliga players
3. Liga players
Regionalliga players
FC Energie Cottbus players
FC Energie Cottbus II players
SC Wiedenbrück 2000 players
Borussia Dortmund II players
Sportfreunde Lotte players
SV Wehen Wiesbaden players
Türkgücü München players
VfL Osnabrück players